Leonardo "Gyno" Pomare (born April 5, 1986) is an American-Panamanian professional basketball player. He is last played professionally with the Yamagata Wyverns of the B.League

College career
Pomare was a four-year player with the University of San Diego.  He originally committed to the Toreros out of El Camino High School for the 2004 season, but sat out the 2004-05 season as a redshirt.  In his first full season with the school, 2005–06, he averaged 10.4 points and 5 rebounds per game en route to being named to the All-West Coast Conference Freshman Team.

Pomare had a prolific career with the Toreros, eventually ending as the school's all-time leading scorer.  He was the first player San Diego player since Scott Thompson (1985–87) to be named to the All-Conference Team three times.  He also led the team to the 2008 NCAA Men's Division I Basketball Tournament where he scored a game-high 22 points on 10-12 shooting for the #13 seed Toreros in a first round upset over the University of Connecticut.

Professional career
Although Pomare was a dark horse candidate for the 2009 NBA Draft, he went undrafted.  On August 18, 2009, the Sendai 89ers of the Japanese bj league, the top flight of Japanese basketball, announced that had signed Pomare for the 2009-10 season.

National team career
Pomare, whose father, Leonardo Pomare, was born in Panama, is eligible to play for the Panama men's national basketball team.  He first participated with the team at the 2009 COCABA Championship.  He also participated with the team at the FIBA Americas Championship 2009. In 2011, he was signed by Quilmes de Mar del Plata in the Torneo Nacional de Ascenso (Argentina).

References

1986 births
Living people
African-American basketball players
American expatriate basketball people in Argentina
American expatriate basketball people in Japan
American men's basketball players
American sportspeople of Panamanian descent
Aomori Wat's players
Basketball players from California
Iwate Big Bulls players
Kanazawa Samuraiz players
Kyoto Hannaryz players
Osaka Evessa players
Panamanian men's basketball players
Passlab Yamagata Wyverns players
People with acquired Panamanian citizenship
Power forwards (basketball)
Quilmes de Mar del Plata basketball players
San Diego Toreros men's basketball players
San-en NeoPhoenix players
Shimane Susanoo Magic players
Sportspeople from Oceanside, California
21st-century African-American sportspeople
20th-century African-American people